"I Don't Believe In Miracles" is a song by American-British singer Sinitta. It was released in September 1988 as the first single from her second album, Wicked. This song was written and produced by Stock Aitken Waterman, and was a top 30 hit in UK and Ireland. This song was also her last single produced by Stock Aitken Waterman, as after this release, Sinitta moved away from working directly with them although she continued to record at PWL under the direction of mixmasters Pete Hammond, Phil Harding and Ian Curnow.

Background and writing
Sinitta disliked the song upon first hearing it, and ask not to record it, feeling its negative sentiment flew in the face of her upbeat stage persona. She also felt the lyric was at odds with her own spiritual beliefs, as she "does believe in miracles". However, noting that the song is a strong fan favourite, the singer now includes it in her live setlist. The track includes elements strongly reminiscent of the Third Movement of Symphony No. 5 by Finnish composer Jean Sibelius.

Chart performance
In UK, "I Don't Believe in Miracles" debuted at number 42 on the chart edition of 24 September 1988, reached a peak of number 22 in its fifth week, and remained on the chart for a total of eight weeks. Similarly, it was a top 25 hit in Ireland where it peaked at number 21 and charted for three weeks. By contrast, it was a top two hit in Finland and a top 12 hit in Spain. On the Eurochart Hot 100, it debuted at number 83 on 15 October 1988, reached number 58 two weeks later, and fell off the chart after five weeks of presence.

Formats and track listings
 7" single 
"I Don't Believe In Miracles" - 3:28
"I Don't Believe In Miracles" (Instrumental) - 3:28

 12" single 
"I Don't Believe In Miracles" (Merlin's Magical Mix) - 6:15
"I Don't Believe In Miracles" (Instrumental Club Mix) - 4:53

Charts

References

1988 songs
Song recordings produced by Stock Aitken Waterman
Sinitta songs
Songs written by Mike Stock (musician)
Songs written by Matt Aitken
Songs written by Pete Waterman
Fanfare Records singles
1988 singles